Mill Creek is a  long 3rd order tributary to Smyrna River in Kent County, Delaware.

Course
Mill Creek rises on the Sewell Branch divide about 0.25 miles east of Underwood Corners in Kent County.  Mill Creek then flows northeast to meet the Smyrna River about 1 mile northeast of Smyrna, Delaware.

Watershed
Mill Creek drains  of area, receives about 44.9 in/year of precipitation, has a topographic wetness index of 631.41 and is about 2.1% forested.

See also
List of rivers of Delaware

References 

Rivers of Delaware
Rivers of Kent County, Delaware